Sport Lisboa e Benfica is a Portuguese sports club based in Lisbon that was formed in Belém in 1904 by 24 football enthusiasts, including Cosme Damião. Benfica have been part of the Portuguese football top flight, Primeira Liga, since its inception in 1934. They have won 37 championships, 26 Taça de Portugal, 7 Taça da Liga, 8 Supertaça Cândido de Oliveira, 3 Campeonato de Portugal, 1 Latin Cup and 2 European Cups.

The supporters of Benfica, who are called , have played an important part in the club's growth during its -year existence. One of those cases was in the early days of the construction of the original Estádio da Luz, when club president Joaquim Ferreira Bogalho asked them for free concrete to build the stadium. They responded by offering 900,000 tons.

In 2005, club president Luís Filipe Vieira implemented an aggressive membership campaign with the intent of reaching 300,000 members. From roughly 95,000 members in 2000, the club reached 160,000 in 2006 – a Guinness World record – only one year after the beginning of the campaign. After Benfica's scheduled renumbering of members in 2015, the number decreased from 247,859 to 156,916 members, with the club losing roughly 35% of its paying associates.

Fanbase and attendances

Benfica are the best supported team in Portugal, according to research conducted by UEFA, with 47% of the total number of supporters. Historically, Benfica have always been seen as working-class of Portugal, growing exponentially as the club accumulated titles since the 1930s. Their total number of supporters is an estimated 5.8 million fans in Portugal, for a total fanbase of roughly 14 million worldwide. In April 2010, Benfica launched SLB Fans, a social network website for its supporters.

Since the beginning of 2005–06, when information regarding attendances was published, Benfica have been consistently one of Portugal's best-attended teams, with an average gate above 42,250 during 11 seasons. In eight of those seasons, Benfica had the league's best attendance, with 2015–16 being their best record, finishing as Europe's 12th best average.

Benfica supporters pay from €100 to €160 annually to be club members, enjoying discounts with some affiliated enterprises, as well as lower prices in season tickets or merchandising.

From season ticket holders, matchday tickets, members fees, and merchandising, Benfica generated roughly €14 million in the 2013–14 season.

Filiations
Since 1911, Benfica has been creating filiations and delegations; independent entities that can play football or other sports, but are closely associated with Benfica, and were usually run by Benfica supporters, although this change in some cases. The first affiliated was Sport Lisboa e Portalegre, created by Leopoldo José Mocho, a club player at that time. The first delegation was Estrela Futebol Clube in Braga, created in November 1914. Some of these delegations have competed against Benfica, like the case of Lusitano in Algarve, that played in the Primeira Liga from 1947 to 1950. Other well known delegations are Sport Huambo e Benfica, Sport Lubango e Benfica, Sport Luanda e Benfica, Sport London e Benfica F.C. and S.L. Benfica de Macau, the first two competing in the Segundona, the next competing in the Girabola, the penultimate in no league, and the latter in the Liga de Elite.

Aside from delegations, Benfica also has Houses which are gathering places for fans, where they can buy merchandising or tickets, watch the club play, or pay members fees. Its creation started in the 1950s due to growing popularity of the club, the first being in Campo Maior, Alentejo. As of May 2015, Benfica has 221 delegations, or houses.

Supporters' groups
During the Estado Novo, no organized supporters' groups existed, as few people had the resources to follow their club throughout the country or abroad. With the transition to democracy in the mid-1970s, and with the newly-found freedom, fans started to converge together to chant for their team, leading to the creation of the first supporters' groups in Portugal, Juve Leo, in 1976.

In Portugal, supporters' groups are obligated to register with the Instituto Português do Desporto e Juventude (Portuguese Institute for Sport and Youth), so that the clubs can provide technical, financial, and material support to those groups. Neither Diabos Vermelhos nor No Name Boys have done so.

Diabos Vermelhos

The Diabos Vermelhos (English: Red Devils) were created on 11 November 1982 and are located in the north corner of the Estádio da Luz, known as Topo Norte.

One of the oldest Portuguese supporters' groups, they were formed when a group of fans gathered in the central ring of the original Estádio da Luz. Its creation was inspired by the European performance of 1982–83. They reached over five thousand members in the following years,  but in the early nineties, a disagreement resulted in the creation of another Benfica's supporters' group, No Name Boys. That affected negatively the group, and members plummeted to an all-time low of just ten. However, as new leaders came, they helped Diabos Vermelhos recover and regain members exponentially, reaching more than 1000 members. Since the early days of the No Name Boys, clashes between the two groups are frequent.

In December 2003, Diabos Vermelhos pressured Benfica's board, after the roller hockey section wanted to sign Paulo Alves, a former Porto player, who attacked one of their own during a match on 6 June 1998.

On 24 January 2012, Diabos Vermelhos announced they were missing a match against Feirense because of high prices asked by Feirense, with the minimum ticket price set at €25 for Benfica supporters, whereas the price for other teams' fans were usually set at €10. They also protested against modern football profit-driven business, placing banners on nearby roofs. Previously, in late 2010, Benfica had requested their supporters to boycott away games due to the unequal prices they had to pay in comparison with other teams.

No Name Boys

The No Name Boys (Portuguese: Rapazes Sem Nome), or Иo Иame Boys, were created on 4 March 1992. They gather in the south corner of the Estádio da Luz, known as Topo Sul.

Created after disagreements with another Benfica's supporters group, Diabos Vermelhos, their initial idea was to stick together and call themselves the "Diabos Vermelhos". However, that name was already registered by head members of the remaining Diabos Vermelhos, so they became a dissent group with no name, therefore the "Иo Иame Boys".

No Name Boys made an immediate impact in the Portuguese  (supporters' groups), with a massive presence of its members in all Benfica matches, either home or away.

On 18 September 1994, three No Name Boys members ‒ Jorge "Gullit" Maurício, Ana Rita Fernandes and Laurentino "Tino" Soares ‒ died in a car accident in Mérida, Spain while they were returning from a Benfica match against Hajduk Split for the UEFA Champions League. From this event, a friendship was made with Hajduk Split ultras Torcida Split.

In 1996, after an incident during the Portuguese Cup final match, which resulted in the death of a Sporting CP supporter, they almost disbanded. However, the group managed to survive, rebuild themselves and overcome the "criminal" image pictured by the Portuguese media and authorities. Also, the group created a unique style in the Portuguese supporters groups' scene, distancing themselves from the traditional Italian-influenced ultras style, which was the dominant trend in Portugal during the 1990s and early 2000s.

The group is known for its secrecy, with no leading figures known to the public eye, no website and no open membership, unlike most other Portuguese supporters' groups. The No Name Boys rarely use elaborate displays at stands and do not use any kind of sound support. They prefer a more simple approach, using only a few large flags, flares and their own vocal support. Salutes are often heard at the group's stand.

They are known for their devotion and support for Benfica, especially in football and futsal. Moreover, some of its members sometimes engage in protests against the club board, staff or players whenever they feel things are not right. Those protests can be silent presences at matches, or explicit criticism at the club's members meetings.

Notes

References

Bibliography

External links

  

S.L. Benfica
Benfica
Portuguese football supporters' associations